Jimmy Gray (16 September 1900 – 10 May 1978) was a Scottish footballer who played as a defender. He signed for Liverpool in 1926 and made just one appearance in the 1928–29 season.

External links
 LFC History profile

1900 births
1978 deaths
Scottish footballers
Liverpool F.C. players
Exeter City F.C. players
Association football defenders